The Helpmann Award for Best Presentation for Children is an award, presented by Live Performance Australia (LPA) at the annual Helpmann Awards since 2001. 

The award recognises excellence in live performance created especially for children and young persons up to the age of 18 years.

Winners and nominees

See also
Helpmann Awards

References

External links
The official Helpmann Awards website

C